Le Patourel (with the variant Pasturel) is a surname found mainly on the island of Guernsey. It comes from the Anglo-Norman French appellation le pastorel ('the shepherd, simpleton'), which is in origin a diminutive of pastour ('shepherd'). At the 1881 census of the United Kingdom, 96 people in Great Britain bore the name; as of about 2016, 15 people bore the name in Great Britain and none in Ireland.

People
Notable people with the name include:
Wallace Le Patourel (1916–79), soldier
John Le Patourel (1909–1981), historian
Owen Le Patourel Franklin (1905–79), composer

References

Surnames of French origin